Toppa Pizzuta is a mountain of Basilicata, Italy.

Mountains of Basilicata
Fiori